A kalpa is a long period of time (aeon) in Hindu and Buddhist cosmology, generally between the creation and recreation of a world or universe.

Etymology
Kalpa in this context, means "a long period of time (aeon) related to the lifetime of the universe (creation)." It is derived from कॢप् (kḷp) +‎ -अ (-a, nominalizing suffix).

Hinduism

In Hinduism, a kalpa is equal to 4.32 billion years, a "day of Brahma" (12-hour day proper) or one thousand mahayugas, measuring the duration of the world. Each kalpa is divided into 14 manvantara periods, each lasting 71 Yuga Cycles (306,720,000 years). Preceding the first and following each manvantara period is a juncture (sandhya) equal to the length of a Satya Yuga (1,728,000 years). A kalpa is followed by a pralaya (dissolution) of equal length, which together constitute a day and night of Brahma. A month of Brahma contains thirty such days and nights, or 259.2 billion years. According to the Mahabharata, 12 months of Brahma (=360 days) constitute his year, and 100 such years his life called a maha-kalpa (311.04 trillion years or 36,000 kalpa + 36,000 pralaya). Fifty years of Brahma are supposed to have elapsed, and we are now in the Shveta-Varaha Kalpa or the first day of his fifty-first year. At the end of a kalpa, the world is annihilated by fire.

The definition of a kalpa equaling 4.32 billion years is found in the Puranas—specifically Vishnu Purana and Bhagavata Purana.

The Matsya Purana (290.3–12) lists the names of 30 kalpas, each named by Brahma based on a significant event in the kalpa and the most glorious person in the beginning of the kalpa. These 30 kalpas or days (along with 30 pralayas or nights) form a 30-day month of Brahma.

The Vayu Purana has a different list of names for 33 kalpas, which G. V. Tagare describes as fanciful derivations.

Buddhism

In the Pali language of early Buddhism, the word kalpa takes the form kappa, and is mentioned in the assumed oldest scripture of Buddhism, the Sutta Nipata. This speaks of "Kappâtita: one who has gone beyond time, an Arahant". This part of the Buddhist manuscripts dates back to the middle part of the last millennium BCE.

Gautama Buddha claimed an incalculable number of Buddhas lived in previous kalpas: Vipassi Buddha 91 kalpas ago, Sikhi Buddha 31 kalpas ago, and three prior Buddhas in the present kalpa. He confines his teachings to the present kalpa, the duration of which he doesn't arithmetically define, but uses a similitude:

A similar similitude is found in the Mountain Pabbata Sutta (SN 15:5) of the Pali Canon:

Described in the Vibhanga division of the Abhidhamma Pitaka are sixteen rupa brahma lokas (worlds or planes) and four higher arupa brahma lokas, each attained through the imperfect, medial or perfect performance of the four states of jhana (meditation), granting a duration of life measured in kalpas that exceed the top-most heavenly loka of 9.216 billion years:
 1st jhana leads to 3 lowest rupa lokas with respective lifespans of 1/3, 1/2 and 1 kalpa.
 2nd jhana leads to 3 higher rupa lokas with respective lifespans of 2, 4 and 8 kalpas.
 3rd jhana leads to 3 more higher rupa lokas with respective lifespans of 16, 32 and 64 kalpas.
 4th jhana leads to 7 highest rupa lokas with respective lifespans ranging from 500 to 16,000 kalpas, and 4 still higher arupa lokas with respective lifespans of 20,000; 40,000; 60,000 and 84,000 kalpas.

At the termination of each kalpa, the lower three rupa brahma lokas, attained through the 1st jhana, and everything below them (six heavens, Earth, etc.) are destroyed by fire (seven suns), only to later again come into being.

In one explanation, there are four different lengths of kalpas. A regular kalpa is approximately 16 million years long (16,798,000 years), and a small kalpa is 1000 regular kalpas, or about 16.8 billion years. Further, a medium kalpa is roughly 336 billion years, the equivalent of 20 small kalpas. A great kalpa is four medium kalpas, or about 1.3 trillion years.

The Buddha did not give the exact length of the maha-kalpa in terms of years. However, he gave several astounding analogies to understand it.

 Imagine a huge empty cube at the beginning of a kalpa, approximately 16 miles in each side. Once every 100 years, you insert a tiny mustard seed into the cube. According to the Buddha, the huge cube will be filled even before the kalpa ends.

In one instance, when some monks wanted to know how many kalpas had elapsed so far, Buddha gave the below analogy:

 If you count the total number of sand particles at the depths of the Ganges river, from where it begins to where it ends at the sea, even that number will be less than the number of passed kalpas.

Another definition of Kalpa is the world where Buddhas are born. There are generally 2 types of kalpa, Suñña-Kalpa and Asuñña-kalpa. The Suñña-Kalpa is the world where no Buddha is born. Asuñña-Kalpa is the world where at least one Buddha is born. There are 5 types of Asuñña-Kalpa:

 Sāra-Kalpa – The world where one Buddha is born.
 Maṇḍa-Kalpa – The world where two Buddhas are born.
 Vara-Kalpa – The world where three Buddhas are born.
 Sāramaṇḍa-Kalpa – The world where four Buddhas are born.
 Bhadda-Kalpa – The world where five Buddhas are born.

The previous kalpa was the Vyuhakalpa (Glorious aeon), the present kalpa is called the Bhadrakalpa (Auspicious aeon), and the next kalpa will be the Nakshatrakalpa (Constellation aeon).

See also
 Brahma
 Hindu units of time
 Kalpa (day of Brahma)
 Manvantara (age of Manu)
 Pralaya (period of dissolution)
 Yuga Cycle (four yuga ages): Satya (Krita), Treta, Dvapara, and Kali
 List of numbers in Hindu scriptures

References

External links
 Kalpa names from various texts

Units of time
Buddhist philosophical concepts
Hindu philosophical concepts

Time in Buddhism
Time in Hinduism